Orbán or Orban is a Hungarian surname and occasional given name. Notable people with the name include:

Given name 
Orban (died 1453), Hungarian iron founder, inventor and engineer
Orbán Kolompár (born 1963), Hungarian politician

Surname 
Adrienn Orbán (born 1986), Hungarian handballer
Alex Orban (born 1939), American fencer
 Árpád Orbán (1938–2008), Hungarian footballer
Attila Orbán (born 1990), Hungarian ice hockey player
 Balázs Orbán (1829–1890), Hungarian writer
Bill Orban (1922–2003), Canadian athlete, scientist and academic
Bill Orban (ice hockey) (born 1944), Canadian ice hockey forward
Desiderius Orban (1884–1986), Hungarian painter, printmaker and teacher
 Éva Orbán (born 1984), Hungarian hammer thrower
Ferenc Orbán (1904–1989), Hungarian athlete
Frank Orban (born 1964), Belgian cyclist
 Gáspár Orbán (born 1992), Hungarian footballer, son of Viktor 
 György Orbán (born 1947), Hungarian composer
László Orbán (disambiguation), multiple people
 Leonard Orban (born 1961), Romanian politician
 Lucas Orban (born 1989), Argentine footballer
 Ludovic Orban (born 1963), Romanian politician, incumbent Prime Minister of Romania
Nándor von Orbán (1910–1981), Hungarian modern pentathlete
Olga Szabó-Orbán (born 1938), Romanian foil fencer
Peter Orban, Swedish sprint canoer
Rémy Orban (1880–1951), Belgian rower
Teale Orban (born 1986), Canadian football quarterback
Viktor Orbán (born 1963), Hungarian politician, incumbent Prime Minister of Hungary
Walthère Frère-Orban (1812–1896), Belgian statesman
Willi Orban (born 1992), Hungarian footballer

Hungarian-language surnames